

The Caudron C.690 was a single-seat training aircraft developed in France in the late 1930s to train fighter pilots to handle high-performance aircraft. It was a conventional low-wing cantilever monoplane that bore a strong resemblance to designer Marcel Riffard's racer designs of the same period. Caudron attempted to attract overseas sales for the aircraft, but this resulted in orders for only two machines - one from Japan, and the other from the USSR. In the meantime, the first of two prototypes was destroyed in a crash that killed René Paulhan, Caudron's chief test pilot.

Despite this, the Armée de l'Air eventually showed interest in the type, and ordered a batch of a slightly refined design. The first of these was not delivered until April 1939, and only 15 C.690Ms were supplied before the outbreak of war.

Variants
C.690 Single-seat fighter trainer aircraft. Four aircraft built.
C.690M Slightly refined version for the Armee de l'Air. Only 15 aircraft were built.

Operators

Armee de l'Air

Imperial Japanese Air Force - One aircraft only (KXC1) .

soviet Air Force - One aircraft only.

Specifications (C.690M)

See also

References

Bibliography

Further reading

 
 

1930s French military trainer aircraft
C.690
Low-wing aircraft
Single-engined tractor aircraft
Aircraft first flown in 1936